Hurricane Martha was the only known tropical cyclone to make landfall in Panama. The eighteenth named storm and twelfth hurricane of the 1969 Atlantic hurricane season, Martha developed in the southwestern Caribbean Sea on November 21. It remained stationary and quickly intensified into a hurricane. Subsequently, Martha weakened and drifted southward. On November 24, Martha made landfall in Veraguas Province, Panama, as a strong tropical storm. The system weakened to a tropical depression and dissipated over land on November 25.

Because the storm weakened prior to landfall, strong winds were not expected or reported in the impacted countries. Agricultural land was flooded in Almirante, Bocas del Toro and streets became inundated in low-lying areas of Puerto Armuelles, Chiriquí. The storm also brought significant rains to Costa Rica. Flooding and mudslides isolated most of the capital city of San José. Numerous streets were inundated in Golfito. Damage in Costa Rica reached $30 million (1969 USD) and 5 deaths were reported.

Meteorological history

Winds aloft in the vicinity of San Andrés, Colombia and the Panama Canal Zone indicated that a low-level circulation developed in the southwestern Caribbean Sea on November 20. Thus, Martha skipped tropical depression status. Martha immediately began deepening, becoming a hurricane at 0000 UTC on November 22. Operationally, the National Hurricane Center initiated advisories at 0300 UTC and erroneously indicated that it was a tropical depression and noted that conditions did not favor significant intensification.

After reaching peak intensity, Martha began drifting due south and slowly weakened. Operationally, winds were thought to be only  when the storm moved inland. Martha was the only tropical cyclone on record to make landfall in Panama, although it is possible that other Panama tropical cyclones were not detected. The storm rapidly weakened inland, deteriorating to tropical depression status early on November 25, twelve hours before dissipating over southern Ngöbe-Buglé Comarca.

Preparations and impact
Since Martha was a relatively weak tropical cyclone, flash floods were emphasized as the greatest threat. The National Hurricane Center stated that rainfall could exceed . Additionally, Arnold Sugg of National Hurricane Center warned residents of gale-force winds and heavy precipitation, advising people living between Bluefields, Nicaragua and Almirante, Bocas del Toro, Panama to take precautions.

In Panama, the storm dropped at least  of precipitation, especially in the western portions of the country. As a result, at least half of agricultural land in Almirante, Bocas del Toro was flooded, causing extensive crop damage. In Puerto Armuelles, Chiriquí, persistent rainfall led to street flooding and inundated other areas. Similar conditions were reported in Golfito, Costa Rica. The effects of Martha resulted in five deaths, all of which occurred in Costa Rica. The nation incurred flooding from heavy rainfall, which caused significant destruction. The capital city of San José received flooding. In all, damages were estimated near $30 million (1969 USD).

See also

List of Category 1 Atlantic hurricanes
Geography of Panama
Hurricane Otto (2016) – A late-season Category 3 hurricane that brought heavy rainfall and disastrous flooding to Panama

References

1969 in the Caribbean
1969 Atlantic hurricane season
Category 1 Atlantic hurricanes
Hurricanes in Costa Rica
Hurricanes in Nicaragua
Hurricanes in Panama